John Dunch (1630–1668) was an English politician who sat in the House of Commons between 1654 and 1659.

John was the second son of Samuel Dunch of Pusey in Berkshire (now Oxfordshire) and his wife, Dulcibella, the daughter of Sir John Moore of East Ilsley in Berkshire. He was the brother-in-law of the wife of Richard Cromwell, Lord Protector of England, Scotland and Ireland. He lived in Pusey and also at North Baddesley in Hampshire.

In 1654, he was elected Member of Parliament for Berkshire in the First Protectorate Parliament. He was re-elected MP for Berkshire in 1656 for the Second Protectorate Parliament and again in 1659 for the Third Protectorate Parliament.

References

1630 births
1668 deaths
People from Test Valley
People from Vale of White Horse (district)
Members of the Parliament of England for Berkshire
English MPs 1654–1655
English MPs 1656–1658
English MPs 1659